Carlos Alberto Díaz (born 15 May 1974) is an Argentine professional footballer who plays as a goalkeeper for Puntarenas.

Career
Díaz, via Boca Juniors, started his career in July 1993 with Argentino of Primera B Metropolitana. The goalkeeper headed to fellow third tier team Deportivo Laferrere in January 1995, remaining for two years. A move to Primera B Nacional soon followed with Atlético Tucumán, though he wouldn't appear competitively for them across 1997 or 1998. Díaz spent the first six months of 1999 back with Laferrere. He took his overall tally of appearances for the club to forty-five during his second spell there. July 1999 saw a return to the second tier with Gimnasia y Tiro. No league matches occurred as they suffered relegation.

Torneo Argentino A's Luján de Cuyo became Díaz's fifth career club in July 2000. He then, shortly into 2000–01, went back to Argentino, before heading off to Defensores de Belgrano of Primera B Metropolitana in January 2001. They won promotion as champions within his first six months, though he didn't feature in any league fixtures; he'd eventually participate in a total of fifteen matches for them between 2002 and 2003, though he'd leave midway through 2002–03 to drop down a tier to Sarmiento. He lasted six months and made eighteen appearances. July 2003 saw Díaz leave for Costa Rica and Cartaginés.

After becoming the club's first foreign goalkeeper, Díaz appeared ninety-eight times for Cartaginés across the 2003–04, 2004–05 and 2005–06 seasons. He returned to his homeland in July 2006 with Torneo Argentino A club Gimnasia y Esgrima, though after six appearances he headed back to Costa Rica with Carmelita in early 2007. Six appearances followed, which preceded Díaz going to Brujas in mid-2007. He remained for one and a half seasons, before switching Desamparados for San Ramón by agreeing terms with Ramonense in January 2009. Midway through that year, Díaz put pen to paper to rejoin Cartaginés.

After being sent off in the final match of his second spell with Cartaginés against Santos de Guápiles on 11 April 2010, Díaz sealed a move to Primera División de Ascenso outfit Cobán Imperial. His stay in Guatemala lasted just a few months, before the goalkeeper secured a contract with newly promoted Ecuadorian Serie B side Deportivo Quevedo in January 2011. In the succeeding June, a return to Costa Rica with Orión was completed. He remained for the entirety of 2011–12, which concluded with relegation to the Segunda División. Díaz spent the first half of 2012–13 back in Guatemalan football with tier two's Petén.

Costa Rica's Puntarenas became Díaz's seventeenth career club in January 2013, as the six-month stint with the Primera División club preceded a short spell with Guatemala's lower league Sayaxché. January 2015 saw Díaz go to Costa Rica again as he joined Segunda División outfit Turrialba. A third spell in Guatemala arrived one year later as he signed for Deportivo Malacateco. He made his debut in Liga Nacional on 24 January 2016 versus Xelajú, which was the first of twenty-seven matches in 2015–16. Díaz would feature twenty-six times in the first part of 2016–17, before spending the rest of the season with Xelajú.

Díaz spent July 2017 to December 2019 in Guatemala's Primera División de Ascenso with five clubs, initially joining Deportivo Mictlán before having time with CSyD Sacachispas, Uruguay de Coronado, Rosario FC and Deportivo Reu. In January 2020, Costa Rican second tier side AD Guanacasteca signed Díaz. He soon broke the record for the division's oldest player. He left halfway through the year, subsequently signing with divisional rivals Puerto Golfito FC. He was voted the Apertura's best goalkeeper, prior to securing a return to second tier Puntarenas in January 2021; aged forty-six.

Career statistics
.

Honours
Defensores de Belgrano
Primera B Metropolitana: 2000–01

References

External links

1974 births
Living people
Footballers from Buenos Aires
Argentine footballers
Association football goalkeepers
Argentine expatriate footballers
Expatriate footballers in Costa Rica
Expatriate footballers in Guatemala
Expatriate footballers in Ecuador
Argentine expatriate sportspeople in Costa Rica
Argentine expatriate sportspeople in Guatemala
Argentine expatriate sportspeople in Ecuador
Primera B Metropolitana players
Primera Nacional players
Torneo Argentino A players
Liga FPD players
Primera División de Ascenso players
Ecuadorian Serie B players
Segunda División de Costa Rica players
Liga Nacional de Fútbol de Guatemala players
Argentino de Quilmes players
Deportivo Laferrere footballers
Atlético Tucumán footballers
Gimnasia y Tiro footballers
Asociación Atlética Luján de Cuyo players
Defensores de Belgrano footballers
Club Atlético Sarmiento footballers
C.S. Cartaginés players
Gimnasia y Esgrima de Mendoza footballers
A.D. Carmelita footballers
Brujas FC players
A.D. Ramonense players
Cobán Imperial players
C.D. Quevedo footballers
Orión F.C. players
Petén FC players
Puntarenas F.C. players
Club Social y Deportivo Sayaxché players
A.D. Turrialba players
C.D. Malacateco players
Xelajú MC players
Deportivo Mictlán players
C.S. Uruguay de Coronado players
Deportivo Reu players